Rosine is a given name.

Notable people with this name 

 Rosine de Chabaud-Latour (1794–1860), French religious thinker and writer
 Rosine Bloch (1832–1891), French opera singer
 Rosine Delamare (1911–2013), French costume designer
 Rosine Deréan (1910–2001), French actress
 Rosine Faugouin (1930–2018), French sprinter
 Rosine Guiterman (1886–1960), Australian activist, teacher, poet and humanitarian
 Rosine Laborde (1824–1907), French singer
 Rosine Lallement, French astronomer
 Rosine Luguet (1921–1981), French actress
 Rosine Mbakam (born 1980), Cameroonian film director
 Rosine Elisabeth Menthe (1663–1701), second wife of Duke Rudolph Augustus of Brunswick-Wolfenbüttel
 Rosine Perelberg (born 1951), Brazilian-born British psychoanalyst
 Rosine Roland (born 1948), Belgian canoeist
 Johanna Rosine Snoek, known as Hans Snoek (1910–2001), Dutch dancer
 Rosine Sori-Coulibaly (born 1958), Burkinabé economist and politician
 Rosine Stoltz (1815–1903), French opera singer
 Rosine Streeter, trade unionist from New Caledonia
 Rosine Vieyra Soglo (1934–2021), member of the Pan-African Parliament from Benin
 Rosine Wallez (born 1957), Belgian sprinter
 Rosine Siewe Yamaleu (born 1991), Cameroonian footballer

Fictional characters 

 Princess Rosine in 1636 play L'Illusion Comique
 Countess Rosine in 1911 opera Oberst Chabert
 Rosine, protagonist in 1926 silent film The Marriage of Rosine
 Rosine Brown, penniless widow in 1932 film But the Flesh Is Weak
 Rosine, maid in 1974 opera Signor Deluso
 Rosine, flamboyant Puerto Rican Latina character in The Jerky Boys comedy act (1989–present)
 Rosine, a character in the Berserk manga (1989–present)
 Rosine, ambitious student in 1998 film Autumn Tale

See also 
 Paulo Rosine (died 1993), leader of Martinican band Malavoi
 Rosina (given name)
 Róisín, Irish given name
 Rosine (disambiguation)

Feminine given names